José Germano de Sales (25 March 1942 – 4 October 1997) was a Brazilian footballer.

Having been transferred to AC Milan from Flamengo in the summer of 1962 at the age of 20, he became the first ever black player to play for the Italian club. Despite a very successful start (3 goals in 5 games), he was soon loaned out to Genoa in November 1962, where he spent the rest of that season with 12 games and 2 goals for the Genoese club.

References

1942 births
1997 deaths
A.C. Milan players
Association football midfielders
Brazilian footballers
CR Flamengo footballers
Pan American Games medalists in football
Pan American Games silver medalists for Brazil
Footballers at the 1959 Pan American Games
Medalists at the 1959 Pan American Games
Brazilian expatriate footballers
Brazilian expatriate sportspeople in Italy
Expatriate footballers in Italy
Serie A players